The 2010 Bossier–Shreveport Battle Wings season was the 9th season for the franchise, and the first in the Arena Football League, coming from the AF2, which dissolved following the 2009 season. The team was coached by Jon Norris and played their home games at CenturyTel Center. With a 3–13 record, the Battle Wings failed to qualify for the playoffs, finishing last in the American Conference.

Standings

Regular season schedule
The Battle Wings opened the season at home against the Vipers on April 3. The conclusion of the regular season was at home against the Vigilantes on July 31.

All times are EDT

Roster

Regular season

Week 1: vs. Alabama Vipers

The Battle wings were in command at halftime with a 33–20 lead, but the Vipers were able to tie the game in the 4th quarter. With the game still tied in the 4th quarter at 48–48, the Battle Wings scored the go-ahead touchdown with five seconds left on an 11-yard pass. The game had a strange ending, as Alabama wide receiver Michael Johnson caught a pass and ran up the field as time expired. Johnson was tackled into the wall that borders the sideline at the 5-yard line and then gave the ball to teammate Jason Geathers who crossed the goal line. The officials signaled the play a touchdown, which meant the Vipers only needed a successful extra point to win the game. After several minutes of discussion between the officials, the original call was overturned as the rules state that a player who is pinned against the wall is out of bounds. Because there was no time left on the clock, the Vipers could not run another play, and the Battle Wings had won the game.

Former Cleveland Gladiators quarterback Raymond Philyaw threw for over 300 yards in his first game with the Battle Wings.

Week 2: vs. Orlando Predators

The Battle Wings improved to 2–0 after being able to hold off the Orlando Predators. The key play of the game was a missed field goal by Orlando as time expired in the 1st half. The ball was fielded off the net by P.J. Berry and returned 55-yards for a touchdown, increasing the Battle Wings' lead to 48–33. In the 2nd half, neither team had consecutive scores, and the Battle Wings came out on top with a 6-point win. Quarterback Raymond Philyaw threw for 9 touchdowns in the win, while P.J. Berry had 201 yards receiving and 7 total touchdowns.

Week 3: at Spokane Shock

The Battle Wings suffered their first loss of the season in a high-scoring game to the Shock. The game was very close until the 4th quarter when the Shock opened up a 65–47 lead in the 4th quarter, set up by two turnovers by Bossier–Shreveport. It was a deficit the Battle Wings could not overcome as they lost the game 78–70. Part of the loss was attributed to an injured P.J. Berry and the coverage put on him by Spokane's defense, forcing Raymond Philyaw to throw to other receivers, Randy Hymes in particular, who caught for 174 yards and 5 touchdowns. Philyaw finished with 349 yards and 10 touchdowns.

Week 4: BYE

Week 5: at Utah Blaze

Leading in just about every category statistically, the Battle Wings failed to outscore the Blaze, resulting in their second consecutive loss. Bossier–Shreveport's offense that night was stopped by Utah's defense on more than one occasion. Looking to take the lead in the 2nd quarter, down 4 points and just a few yards from the end zone on 4th down, the Battle Wings were given a new set of downs following a defensive pass interference penalty. Despite this, the Battle Wings were still unable to score, turning the ball over on downs. On the opening drive of the 3rd quarter, Raymond Philyaw was intercepted by Tour'e Carter, and Utah took advantage of the turnover with a touchdown on the ensuing drive. In the 4th quarter, the Battle Wings scored an early touchdown to cut the deficit to just 5 points. However on three of their final four drives, the Battle Wings turned the ball over on downs which resulted in the loss. Philyaw finished with 5 touchdowns and 229 yards, while Randy Hymes caught for 123 yards and 2 touchdowns.

Week 6: at Oklahoma City Yard Dawgz

In the highest scoring game in AFL history, tied with the New York Dragons and Carolina Cobras game in 2001, Bossier was up 79–76 when Timon Marshall returned a missed 22-yard field goal for a touchdown to win the game.

Week 7: vs. Tampa Bay Storm

Week 8: at Alabama Vipers

Week 9: vs. Tulsa Shock

Week 10: at Dallas Vigilantes

Week 11: vs. Iowa Barnstormers

Week 12: at Arizona Rattlers

Week 13: at Tampa Bay Storm

Week 14: vs. Oklahoma City Yard Dawgz

Week 15: at Tulsa Talons

Week 16: BYE

Week 17: vs. Jacksonville Sharks

Week 18: vs. Dallas Vigilantes

References

Bossier-Shreveport